Isabelle Sbrissa (born 1971 in Geneva) is a Swiss writer, active in the field of poetry and theater. She is considered a representative of the new generation of Swiss poetry.

Biography 

Sbrissa was born in 1971 in Geneva and currently lives there.

Sbrissa studied at the Institut Littéraire de Bienne.

After a period of time writing plays for theater, Sbrissa became interested in the vocal dimension of poetry. She experiments with different forms of performing poetry by mingling polyphony and the interference of several languages. Her poetry places importance on orality, revisiting canonical forms and translations in a creative way. She often uses translation in an unknown language, thus exploring the musicality of language and emphasizing it over the function of communication.

Her poems mix together different languages, putting forth similarities in their vocal universe, deploying open significations inclining towards a form of singing.

Publications 
 La Traversée du désert,(Éditions Bernard Campiche 2009) 
 Le Quatre-Mains (Éditions Bernard Campiche, 2009)
 Travaux d’Italie (dans Grumeaux, Violence, n° 3, 2012, Éditions NOUS, 2012)
 poèmes poèmes1 (éditions disdill, 2013)
 R (éditions disdill, 2013)
 Mot a mort (KIN issue 3 2013.01)

Online publications 
 sonnetsTM, 2015 sur sitaudis.fr
Noëlle Revaz, Escales & Isabelle Sbrissa, intimités, amuse-bouche et cycles littérature de partout
 Baccalà alla ligure / Baquelle à la dure, revue coaltar?
 Langue morte (audio)
 Ceylor (audio)
 Transformation de la vie antérieure d'Oscar Pastor

References 

Swiss poets in French
Swiss women poets
Living people
1971 births
Writers from Geneva
21st-century Swiss poets
21st-century Swiss women writers